The 1972 World Amateur Snooker Championship was the fifth edition of the tournament that later became known as the IBSF World Snooker Championship. The 1972 tournament was played in venues in Wales from 4 to 20 January 1973. Ray Edmonds defeated Mannie Francisco 11–10 in the final to win the title.

Tournament summary
The first World Amateur Snooker Championship was held in 1963. Jonathan Barron, who won the title in 1970, was the defending champion for 1972.

The tournament was held at venues in Wrexham, Cardiff, and Aberdare from 4 to 20 January 1973. There were four round-robin groups, with the top two players from each group progressing to a second round-robin stage. The top two players from the second-stage groups progressed to the knockout stage.

Ray Edmonds defeated Mannie Francisco 11–10 in the final to win the title. The final was held on 19 and 20 January, at Sophia Gardens Pavilion, Cardiff. Edmonds was 1–6 behind at the end of the first day's play, but won five of the seven frames in the afternoon  on 20 January to reduce his deficit to two frames at 6–8. Franscico won the first frame of the third session to lead 9–6, before Edmonds levelled the match at 9–9. Edmonds won the last frame to claim victory.

Edmonds made the highest  of the tournament, 101, during the first group stage; and the highest break of the final, 40.

Qualifying groups
The final tables are shown below. Players in bold qualified for the next round.

Group A

Group B

Group C

Group D

Semi-final Group A

Semi-final Group B

Knockout
Players in bold denote match winners.

Final
Scores in bold indicate winning  scores.

References

Snooker amateur tournaments
International sports competitions hosted by Wales
1973 in snooker
Sports competitions in Cardiff